Roanmore GAA is a GAA club in Waterford City, Republic of Ireland.  Formed in 1970, the club made rapid progress, achieving Senior Hurling status in 1980.  The club's greatest achievement was winning back to back Waterford Senior Hurling Championships in 1989 and 1990.

The club has provided many players to the Waterford Senior Hurling Panel over the years, most notably, Noel Crowley and Kieran Delahunty. In 2010 Roanmore secured a return to the senior ranks with a victory over Ardmore in the Intermediate County final in Dungarvan.

Honours
Waterford Senior Hurling Championships: 2
 1989, 1990
Waterford Intermediate Hurling Championships: 1
 2010
 Waterford Junior Hurling Championships 1
 1980
Waterford Junior Hurling Championships - Attached 1
 2010
 Waterford Junior Football Championships: 2
 1980, 2020
 Waterford Under-21 Hurling Championships: 2
 1981, 1982
 Waterford Under-21 Football Championships: 1
 1984
 Waterford Minor Hurling Championships Division 1: 3
 1977, 1979, 1981
 Waterford Minor Hurling Championships Division 2:  3
 2010, 2016 , 2021
 Waterford Minor Football Championships: 1
 1977

External links
 Official Roanmore GAA Club website

Gaelic games clubs in County Waterford
Hurling clubs in County Waterford
Gaelic football clubs in County Waterford